George Douglas Sanders (July 24, 1933 – April 12, 2020) was an American professional golfer who won 20 events on the PGA Tour and had four runner-up finishes at major championships.

Early years
He was born into a poor family in Cedartown, Georgia, northwest of Atlanta, where his father farmed and drove trucks. Sanders was the fourth of five children and picked cotton as a teenager. The family home was near a nine-hole course and he was a self-taught golfer.

Amateur career
Sanders accepted an athletic scholarship to the University of Florida in Gainesville, where he played for the Gators golf team in National Collegiate Athletic Association (NCAA) competition in 1955.  In his single year as a Gator golfer, Sanders and the team won a Southeastern Conference (SEC) championship and earned a sixth-place finish at the NCAA championship tournament—the Gators' best national championship finish at that time. Sanders won the 1956 Canadian Open as an amateur—the only amateur ever to do so—and turned professional shortly thereafter. Sanders was the last amateur to win on the PGA Tour until Scott Verplank in 1985.

Professional career
Sanders had thirteen top-ten finishes in major championships, including four second-place finishes: 1959 PGA Championship, 1961 U.S. Open, 1966 and 1970 Opens. In 1966, he became one of the few players in history to finish in the top ten of all four major championships in a single season, despite winning none of them. He took four shots from just 74 yards as the leader playing the final hole of the 1970 Open Championship at St Andrews, missing a sidehill  putt to win, then lost the resulting 18-hole playoff by a single stroke the next day to Jack Nicklaus. His final victory on tour came in June 1972 at the Kemper Open, one stroke ahead of runner-up Lee Trevino.

Sanders is remembered for an exceptionally short, flat golf swing — a consequence, it appears, of a painful neck condition that radically restricted his movements.

He was a member of the U.S. Ryder Cup team in 1967, which won in Houston.

Personal life
Sanders was a stylish, flamboyant dresser on the golf course, which earned him the nickname "Peacock of the Fairways." Esquire magazine named Sanders one of America's Ten Best Dressed Jocks in August 1972.

Sanders identified himself as the lead character, a playboy PGA Tour golfer, in the golf novel Dead Solid Perfect, by Dan Jenkins.

Sanders wrote a golf instruction book, "Compact Golf", published in 1964, the title of which linked to Sanders' short golf swing. His autobiography "Come swing with me" was published in 1974.

In his autobiography, Sanders said he was invited and intended to accompany fellow pro golfer and 1964 Open winner Tony Lema on the flight in a private plane in 1966 that crashed with no survivors. Sanders changed his schedule at the last minute and did not join Lema on the flight.

After retiring from competitive golf, Sanders was active in his own corporate golf entertainment company for nearly 20 years, and sponsored the Doug Sanders International Junior Golf Championship in Houston, Texas. From 1988 to 1994, he also sponsored the Doug Sanders Celebrity Classic.

Sanders died in his adopted hometown of Houston, Texas, on April 12, 2020 from natural causes. He was 86.

Honors
Sanders was a member of the Florida Sports Hall of Fame, Georgia Sports Hall of Fame, and the Georgia Golf Hall of Fame.  He was also inducted into the University of Florida Athletic Hall of Fame as a "Gator Great."

Amateur wins 
1955 Mexican Amateur

Professional wins (24)

PGA Tour wins (20) 

PGA Tour playoff record (5–5)

Far East Circuit wins (1)
1963 Yomiuri International

Other wins (2)
1957 Colombian Open
1959 Sahara Pro-Am

Senior PGA Tour wins (1)

Results in major championships 
Amateur

Professional

CUT = missed the half-way cut
R256, R128, R64 = Round in which player lost in match play
"T" indicates a tie for a place

Sources: Masters Tournament, U.S. Open and U.S. Amateur, Open Championship, PGA Championship, 1956 British Amateur

Summary

Most consecutive cuts made – 14 (1965 PGA – 1969 Masters)
Longest streak of top-10s – 4 (1966 Masters – 1966 PGA)

See also 

List of American Ryder Cup golfers
List of Florida Gators men's golfers on the PGA Tour
List of golfers with most PGA Tour wins
List of University of Florida Athletic Hall of Fame members

References

External links 

Georgia Sports Hall of Fame Profile

American male golfers
Florida Gators men's golfers
PGA Tour golfers
PGA Tour Champions golfers
Ryder Cup competitors for the United States
Golfers from Georgia (U.S. state)
People from Cedartown, Georgia
Sportspeople from the Atlanta metropolitan area
1933 births
2020 deaths